The Ivan Franko-class passenger ship (project 301, in Germany known as Seefa 750) was a class of Soviet ocean liners and cruise ships, operated by the Baltic State Shipping Company (BGMP) and Black Sea Shipping Company (ChMMP or BLASCO).
The five Soviet ships Ivan Franko, Aleksandr Pushkin, Taras Shevchenko, Shota Rustaveli and Mikhail Lermontov were constructed in 1963–1972 by the East German company VEB Mathias-Thesen Werft, in Wismar. The class was named after its lead ship, which took its name from the Ukrainian poet Ivan Franko. The last remaining vessel, the Aleksandr Pushkin – last known as Marco Polo, was retired in 2020 and beached in Alang, India for scrapping on January 13, 2021.

Description and construction 

The Ivan Franko class surpassed the earlier  as Germany's (in both parts of Germany) largest passenger ships after World War II. With a length of  the Ivan Franko vessels were  longer than the prior largest passenger ship,  and its classmates. The Ivan Franko vessels were also  wider, and with a gross register tonnage of 19,861, almost three times larger.

The construction of this class featured some notable differences from contemporary ships built in the west. Among other things they offered cabins for six people and had three taps in the bathrooms – for hot, cold and sea water – Both of these features had been long abandoned in western liners. The ships also featured certain forward-looking features, such as all outside accommodation for passengers as well as the crew, and an indoor/outdoor swimming pool with a sliding glass roof.

Ocean liners/cruise ships of Project 301/Seefa 750

Overview

See also 
 List of cruise ships

References

External links 

 "Ivan Franko" class 
 Ivan Franko IMO 5415901

Ocean liner classes
Ships built in East Germany
Passenger ships of the Soviet Union
East Germany–Soviet Union relations
Ships built in Wismar
Ships of Black Sea Shipping Company